Baday may refer to:
Ahmed Baday (b. 1979), Moroccan runner
Baday, Afghanistan, a place in Afghanistan
Baday, Russia, a village in Irkutsk Oblast, Russia
Lisa Baday (b. 1957), Canadian fashion designer